Badsworth Boy (19 March 1975 – October 2002) was a British Thoroughbred racehorse. He completed a hat-trick from 1983 to 1985 in the Queen Mother Champion Chase. In so doing, he also became a winner for all three members of the Dickinson family as Tony, Michael and Monica all trained him in their turn, and he became the 12th horse in jumping history to pass the £100,000 earnings mark.

Racing career
Badsworth Boy was sold as a yearling for 2,800 guineas and entered training with Snowy Wainwright. As a two-year-old in 1977, the colt ran eight times, winning minor events at Beverley Racecourse in June and July. He was then sold to Doug Armitage and was gelded in preparation for a jumping career.

In his first season over obstacles, he won a race at Sedgefield Racecourse and then finished third in the Triumph Hurdle. In all, Badsworth Boy claimed victory eight times over hurdles and eighteen times over fences, in spite of the fact that his very fast jumping sometimes led to disaster. In the first of his three Champion Chase triumphs, Badsworth Boy won by a distance from Artifice, with his stablemate and favourite Rathgorman - the 1982 winner - well behind. In 1984, he had ten lengths to spare over Little Bay, and in his final success, he finished the same distance in front of Far Bridge. As of 2020 he remains the only horse with three wins in the race. His final trip into the winner's enclosure came in January 1987.

Badsworth Boy was diagnosed with navicular disease as a juvenile and suffered from arthritis throughout his life. Michael Dickinson described him as the best horse he ever trained.

Retirement and death
Badsworth Boy was retired to his owner's Little Lane Farm at Thorpe Hensley, near Rotherham. He died of a heart attack at the age of twenty-seven in October 2002.

Pedigree

Badsworth Boy was inbred 3 × 4 to Nasrullah, meaning that this stallion appears in both the third and fourth generations of his pedigree.

References

 The Complete Encyclopedia of Horse Racing - by Bill Mooney and George Ennor

1975 racehorse births
2002 racehorse deaths
Cheltenham Festival winners
Racehorses bred in the United Kingdom
Racehorses trained in the United Kingdom
Thoroughbred family 14-c